Alexandra (Alex) Matthews (born 3 August 1993) is an English rugby union player. She made her debut for England in 2011 and was a member of the winning 2014 Women's Rugby World Cup squad.

International career 
Matthews first played for England in 2011. In 2014 she was one of the youngest members of the England 2014 Women's Rugby World Cup squad, having played in the final versus Canada. Matthews had returned from a hip operation just two weeks pre-selection for the tournament to win a place on the team.

She played for the England 7s team, going semi-professional in 2013 and full-time in 2014 while completing her degree. In 2014 she was part of the training squad for the 2016 Olympic Games but was forced to leave three months before the Games due to illness and injury.

In 2017 she returned to England 15s as part of the 2017 Women's Rugby World Cup squad, playing in every game. England finished second in the tournament. Matthews was named Player of the Match for the side's game against the USA.

She switched back to 7s again in 2018 to take Bronze at the 2018 Commonwealth Games and is currently on a hybrid contract between England's senior team and the Great Britain women's rugby 7s team that was meant to play at the 2020 Olympics, postponed due to COVID-19.

Matthews was named RPA Women's Sevens Player of the Year in 2018.

She played for England in the 2020 Women's Six Nations Championship, which the side won. She was named in the England squad for the delayed 2021 Rugby World Cup held in New Zealand in October and November 2022.

Club career 
Matthews joined Worcester Warriors in 2020 after the funding for the Women's 7s GB team was cut earlier that year.

She previously played for Richmond alongside her older sister, Fran Matthews. In 2014, Matthews won the Premiership and Cup with Richmond.

Early life and education 
She started playing rugby aged three at Camberley RFC, where she played minis rugby until she had to stop playing with the boys' U12 team, although she continued to train with the boys' team for a further two years. Her sister Fran Matthews also plays both sevens and fifteens rugby for England.

Matthews attended Kings International College secondary school and Hartpury College before completing a degree in Sports Psychology at Roehampton University alongside her rugby commitments. She worked as a part time carer between 2012 and 2015.

During the 2020 pandemic lockdown she spent time travelling the UK in her campervan.

References

External links
 

1993 births
Living people
Commonwealth Games bronze medallists for England
Commonwealth Games medallists in rugby sevens
England women's international rugby union players
English female rugby union players
Female rugby union players
Olympic rugby sevens players of Great Britain
Rugby sevens players at the 2018 Commonwealth Games
Rugby sevens players at the 2020 Summer Olympics
Rugby union players from Camberley
England international women's rugby sevens players
Medallists at the 2018 Commonwealth Games